Nasi jinggo (also known as jinggo rice) is a Balinese ready-to-eat street food, packaged in small portions of banana leaves. Apart from being eaten as street food, nasi jinggo is also used in various religious ceremonies such as the Ngaben funeral rites, birthday celebrations, and meetings.

Etymology 
The origin of the term "jinggo" is uncertain. One theory states that prior to the 1997 Asian financial crisis, nasi jenggo had been sold for Rp. 1500 (approximately $ USD in )  — in the Chinese Hokkien language, jeng go means "one thousand five hundred". Another theory is that it comes from the title of the 1966 Italian Spaghetti Western film Django, while another version states that it comes from the word jagoan, referring to Balinese motorcyclists, whose favorite food after a night out was nasi jinggo.

History 
The history of nasi jinggo began in the 1980s, and was first sold on Gajah Mada Street in Denpasar, Bali. Due to the proximity of the 24-hour Kumbasari Market, a Javanese husband-wife team began selling the dish as a late-night snack. The popularity of nasi jinggo has spread beyond Bali to other parts of Indonesia.

Presentation 
Nasi jinggo is served in a banana leaf package, containing a handful of white rice with side dishes and chili sauce. The side dishes are typically sambal goreng tempeh (tempeh, anchovies, and peanuts fried with sambal) serundeng (sautéed grated coconut), and shredded chicken. Nasi jinggo can also be made with yellow rice, while side dishes can be beef or pork. Nasi jinggo is also sometimes served with mie goreng (fried noodles) and eggs.

Gallery

See also 
 Nasi kucing

References 

 Balinese cuisine
 Indonesian cuisine